Vinh University, established on July 16, 1959 under Decree 375/ND of government, is a comprehensive university for the North Central region of Vietnam. Professor Nguyễn Thúc Hào was the first headmaster. He also led the efforts of building the university since the early days.

The school is a multi-level institutions (from pre-school level, high school to college, graduate school), multi-sector (sector 42 undergraduate, 28 master's degree majors, 10 doctoral training programs) with nearly 36,000 students, students and trainees from 54 provinces and cities nationwide and over 300 international students to study or research, with a staff of nearly 950 staff, has 56 faculty in Professor, Associate Professor, Dr 118, nearly 500 Masters, 4 Senior Lecturer, 121 Senior Lecturer ...

Vinh University is one of the first universities in the country to use the course credit system. Thus, learners will benefit an advanced method of training, have the opportunity to learn two programs simultaneously; the initiative in selecting courses, class times, class appropriate candidates can register for test admitted to an easy industry, after a semester if academic results achieved from the average and above may register for a course that they want others to be secondary graduate formal university degree (in 4 recent study, there were thousands of students learn more sectors 2) Good students can successfully complete the course before the deadline a year students are enrolled online and internet.

The data
Year of establishment 	1959
Category 	Public universities
Principal 	Prof. Dr. Dinh Xuan Khoa
University Students - Students - NCS 	Approximately 40,000
Lecturer 	3 GS ; 53 PGS ; 118 TS ; 500 Ma ; 4 Senior Lecturer ; 121 Senior Lecturer
Science 	19 Faculty training
Address 	182 Le Duan Street
Vinh City, Nghe An
Phone 	038.866452
City 	Vinh
Web address 	http://www.vinhuni.edu.vn

History

July 16, 1959, the Minister of Education signed Decree No. 375/ND established College of Education Sub performance Vinh. Basis of the first school built in the public sector (old) of Vinh town at that time. Classification performance Vinh College of Education renamed Pedagogical University of Vinh 637/QD Decision 28 August 1962 the Minister of Education. April 25, 2001, the Prime Minister signed Decision No. 62/2001/QD-TTg rename Pedagogical University of Vinh Vinh University.

Vinh University is a unit of public service under the Ministry of Education and Training, have legal status, have an account, stamp and its own icon. Decision 62/2001/QD-TTg dated 04/25/2001 of the Prime Minister has prescribed duties of Vinh University is to train teachers with university degrees and gradually open the training consistent with the ability of the school and the human resources needs of social science research for economic development - society.

Vinh University is a university institution multidisciplinary, multi-level in the North Central region, providing high quality human resources and adapt to the working world; a center for scientific research, application and technology transfer to serve the cause of economic development - economic development of the region and country; is the key national universities, a number of international industry standards.

Half a century building and growth, Vinh University was awarded several prizes, honors. The school was awarded the Second Class Labor Decoration (1979), rank Labor Medal (1992), third-class Independence Medal (1995), Second Class Independence Medal (2001), Hero Labor (2004), Co emulation of the Government (2007), first-class Independence Medal (2009), the Friendship Medal awarded by the State, Laos and many other honors.

name through the time
1959 - 1962: Classification performance Pedagogical University of Vinh
1962 - 2001: Pedagogy University of Vinh
2001 to present: Vinh University

Vinh University now
Currently (2010), Vinh University has: 19 scientific training, a specialized high schools, a nursery school practice, a Research Institute of language and culture, a scientific journal. 26 departments, centers, institutes and stations.

Educational programs of Vinh University is built on the basis of the framework program of the Ministry of Education, learn the advanced program in the world, meeting social needs and ensure interoperability. Currently, Vinh University is applying to study methods of training the credit. Later in 2010, Vinh University will gain a first program of advanced training.

Vinh University students, with a platform of "bravery, wisdom, civilization, volunteers," is coming from 54 provinces and cities nationwide and has over 600 students, students from Thailand, Laos, China ... 2008-2009 school year, Vinh University has 34,000 HS-SV-HV (including more than 20,000 students, students studying in a school facility) with 43 higher education sector.

Training activities of the school day is expanding to meet the needs of society. 2007-2008 school year, Vinh University trained 43 branches and 36 branches university graduate, and the third generation Gifted High School.

Currently, Vinh University is a multidisciplinary field training, which remains the core pedagogy.

the university's library system, equipment and learning facilities are increasingly being improved and modernized to meet the requirements of multi-disciplinary education.

In addition to the current area in the region Ben Thuy Truong Thi (14ha), the University has been planned and developed on the basis of II in Nghi Loc district with an area of 258 ha (for Faculty of Agriculture, Forestry and Fisheries, National Defense Education Centre and a number of units other). In addition, the school is building a base for training, scientific research, technology transfer in some other localities (Camp practice aquatic Hung Nguyen, Center for aquaculture experiments Amenities Spring, ...).

Vinh University now has 935 officials and public employees, including 639 faculty, 295 administrative staff. Regarding the title, training level, the school has 118 doctors, 500 masters, 3 professors, 53 associate professors, 4 senior lecturers, 121 lecturers and 13 army officers are seconded to work Education in the Department of Defense. For over 50 years of construction and development, Vinh University has trained over 70,300 teachers, bachelor of science, engineering, including formal university is 29,700 people in 53 provinces and cities nationwide and many countries in the region (mainly China, Laos, and Thailand).

The extent of the training is increasingly being expanded to meet human resource needs of various localities. Academic year 2010 - 2011, 46 schools of higher education sector, including 15 teacher training programs, 21 bachelor's training programs, seven engineering; 28 majors master's degree, 10 majors Ph.D. create professional high school level and five subjects with more than 34,000 learners. The school has joint training by the method of studying partial "2 + 2" with China, Thailand ... Training methods follow the credit system.

In recent years, the school has trained nearly 5,000 master, more than 100 doctors in the two areas which are strengths of the school: basic science and science education. A high-level human resources for society, schools are also associated with other prestigious universities masters training in the field of economics, engineering, education ...

From 2001 - 2008, officials of the school has hosted 19 scientific research projects at national, ministerial-level 147, which has nine key themes for the 1555 theme and level. Activities of scientific research, application, development and technology transfer, foreign affairs and international cooperation had great results, especially in recent years. Only from 2001 to 2007, Vinh University has implemented 19 research projects at the country, 147 projects of Ministry (9 topics, including key ministerial level) and 1,555 subjects level (school and Science). Activities of scientific research is increasingly associated with social needs. External activities and international cooperation is increasingly expanding and improving the quality and efficiency. Currently, the university has partnerships with over 30 universities and scientific organizations, educational institutions abroad.

Decision 197/2007/QD - dated 28/12/2007 of the Prime Minister stated: "Building An Art center education - higher education in the North Central. Investment upgrade Vinh University into the University of international standards ". On 27/02/2008 46/TB-VPCP of the Government Office on conclusions of Prime Minister Nguyen Tan Dung: Nghe An province work with the Ministry of Education to report to the Prime Minister on the University Vinh in a list of the key national universities Vietnam .

On 07/11/2011, Deputy Prime Minister Nguyen Thien Nhan signed written consent of 1136/TTg-KGVX for Vinh University to be added to the list of universities to build a major university the country. Thus far, in Vietnam there were 16 higher education establishments selected to build a national key university, including two national universities, five universities and nine regional territorial universities and institutes in the fields and key national industries, including the National University of Hanoi, Vietnam National University, Ho Chi Minh City, Thai Nguyen University, Hue University, Danang University , Pedagogical University of Hanoi University of Pedagogy, Ho Chi Minh City, Polytechnic University of Hanoi, Agricultural University Hanoi University Hanoi National Economics University Hanoi Medical University of Economics Ho Chi Minh City, Medical University of Ho Chi Minh City, Can Tho University, Military Technical Academy and the University of Vinh. These universities will focus on investment and construction to become the basis of the level of training and advanced research work leading to the development of a network of universities in Vietnam.

References 

 http://eng.vinhuni.edu.vn/
 https://www.4icu.org/reviews/12243.shtml
 :vi:Trường Đại học Vinh
 http://kc-dhv.org/
 http://www.vinhuni.edu.vn/
 http://www.edu.net.vn/Default.aspx?tabindex=0&tabid=2&mid=38&tid=100&iid=1400
 http://www.vinhuni.edu.vn/opennews.php?Id=171
 http://congannghean.vn/NewsDetails.aspx?NewsID=1211

Universities in Vietnam